Calafia Airlines is a Mexican low-cost airline founded in 1993, based in the Cabo San Lucas International Airfield. It was formerly named Aéreo Calafia till mid 2016, when as part of a commercial expansion project they decided to use a more commercial name, since they are negotiating international destinations.  It has Embraer and Airbus equipment. It has regular flights to the Baja California Peninsula and the Mexican Pacific coast, in addition to charter flights and tours.

Fleet

The Calafia Airlines fleet consists of the following aircraft (as of February 2023):

Historic fleet
 Cessna 208 Caravan
 Cessna 210 Centurion
 Cessna 182 Skylane
 Piper PA-31 Navajo

Destinations
Calafia Airlines has the following destinations:

Baja California
 Mexicali (Mexicali International Airport)
 Tijuana (Tijuana International Airport)

Baja California Sur
 Cabo San Lucas (Cabo San Lucas International Airport) Hub
 Ciudad Constitución (Ciudad Constitución Airport)
 La Paz (La Paz International Airport) Hub
 Loreto (Loreto International Airport)
 San José del Cabo (Los Cabos International Airport)

Chihuahua
 Chihuahua (Chihuahua International Airport)

Jalisco
 Puerto Vallarta (Licenciado Gustavo Díaz Ordaz International Airport)
 Guadalajara (Miguel Hidalgo y Costilla Guadalajara International Airport)

Nuevo León
 Monterrey (Monterrey International Airport)

Sinaloa
 Culiacán (Culiacán International Airport)
 Guasave (Campo Cuatro Milpas Airport)
 Los Mochis (Los Mochis International Airport)
 Mazatlán (Mazatlán International Airport)

Sonora
 Ciudad Obregón (Ciudad Obregón International Airport)
 Guaymas (Guaymas International Airport)
 Hermosillo (Hermosillo International Airport)
 Puerto Peñasco (Mar de Cortés International Airport)

Incidents and accidents

References

External links
 Calafia Airlines Official Page 

Airlines established in 1993
Airlines of Baja California
Airlines of Mexico
Transportation in Baja California Sur